Columbia Historic District may refer to:

in the United States

 Columbia Historic District (Sonora, California), listed on the National Register of Historic Places (NRHP)
 Columbia Green Historic District, Columbia, Connecticut, NRHP-listed
 Columbia City Historic District (Columbia City, Indiana), NRHP-listed in Whitley County
 Columbia Avenue Historic District, Davenport, Iowa, NRHP-listed
 Columbia Commercial Historic District (Columbia, Kentucky), NRHP-listed in Adair County
 West Columbia Street District, Somerset, Kentucky, NRHP-listed in Kentucky
 Downtown Columbia Historic District (Columbia, Louisiana), NRHP-listed in Louisiana
 Columbia Road–Bellevue Street Historic District, Dorchester, Boston, Massachusetts, USA
 Downtown Columbia Historic District (Columbia, Mississippi), NRHP-listed in Marion County
 Downtown Columbia, Missouri, which includes a Downtown Columbia Historic District NRHP-listed
 East Columbia Historic District (Farmington, Missouri), NRHP-listed
 Columbia Historic District (Columbia, North Carolina), NRHP-listed
 Columbia River Highway Historic District, Oregon, NRHP-listed
 Columbia Historic District (Columbia, Pennsylvania), NRHP-listed
 Columbia Historic District I, Columbia, South Carolina, NRHP-listed
 Columbia Historic District II, Columbia, South Carolina, NRHP-listed
 Columbia Commercial Historic District (Columbia, South Carolina), NRHP-listed in South Carolina
 Columbia Commercial Historic District (Columbia, Tennessee), NRHP-listed in Maury County
 Columbia West End Historic District (Columbia, Tennessee), NRHP-listed in Maury County
 East Columbia Historic District (East Columbia, Texas), NRHP-listed in Texas
 Columbia Forest Historic District, Arlington, Virginia, NRHP-listed
 Columbia City Historic District (Seattle, Washington), NRHP-listed
 Columbia Historic District (Cedarburg, Wisconsin), NRHP-listed in Wisconsin

Other uses
Columbia Commercial Historic District (disambiguation)
Downtown Columbia Historic District (disambiguation)
East Columbia Historic District (disambiguation)
Columbia City Historic District (disambiguation)

See also

 
 
 District of Columbia (disambiguation) and Columbia District
 Columbia (disambiguation)